Round Grove Creek is a stream in Jackson County in the U.S. state of Missouri.

Round Grove Creek was named for a round grove of trees along its course. It empties into the Blue River.

See also
List of rivers of Missouri

References

Rivers of Jackson County, Missouri
Rivers of Missouri